Libra Internet Bank was founded in 1996 as Banca Română pentru Relansare Economică and it is based in Bucharest, Romania.

Libra Internet Bank is a member of New Century Holdings (NCH).

Banks of Romania
Banks established in 1996